Pollinger is a surname. Notable people with the surname include:

Ben Pollinger (born ?), U.S. chef
Franz Ignaz Pollinger ( mid-19th century), Austrian painter
Laurence Pollinger ( 1935–1956), English literary agent (see Pearn, Pollinger & Higham)
Samuel Pollinger (1868–1943), Canadian Anglican bishop
Frank W. Pollinger (born ?), Economist/Sociologist, creator of the brand Xbox